A special election was held in  on March 8, 1825 to fill a vacancy caused by Representative-elect James Miller declining to serve.  The special election was held at the same time as the run-off election held to fill the 6th seat in New Hampshire's delegation.

Election results

See also
List of special elections to the United States House of Representatives

References

New Hampshire 1825 at-large
New Hampshire 1825 at-large
1825 at-large
New Hampshire at-large
United States House of Representatives at-large
United States House of Representatives 1825 at-large